The Council of Oman is a bicameral parliament, made up of the members of the State Council and the Consultation Council, as stipulated in Article 58 of the Basic Law of the State. It is considered to be the main Parliament in Oman. It assists the government in drawing up the general policies of the state. The Council meets at the request of the sultan to study and discuss matters raised by him, taking all its decisions on the basis of a majority vote. The sultan addresses all the members of this council on an annual basis. There are 15 women members (14 of them are in the state council) among the 167 members of the parliament.

In November 2009 construction work began on the Majlis Oman project, a landmark building to accommodate the parliament assembly hall and the upper and lower houses. The development, designed by q-dar and built by Carillion Alawi, was completed in 2013.

In October 2011, Sultan Qaboos bin Said al Said expanded the power of the Council of Oman.

See also

Politics of Oman
List of legislatures by country
 :Category:Members of the Council of Oman

References

External links
 Shura

Politics of Oman
Political organizations based in Oman
Government of Oman